Sébastien Centomo (born March 26, 1981) is a Canadian former professional ice hockey player. He played one game in the National Hockey League (NHL) with the Toronto Maple Leafs during the 2001–02 season, on March 6, 2002 against the Detroit Red Wings. The rest of his career, which lasted from 2001 to 2010, was spent in the minor leagues.

Career statistics

Regular season and playoffs

External links
 

1981 births
Living people
Canadian expatriate ice hockey players in Finland
Canadian expatriate ice hockey players in the United States
Canadian ice hockey goaltenders
Greensboro Generals players
HIFK (ice hockey) players
Ice hockey people from Quebec
Las Vegas Wranglers players
Long Beach Ice Dogs (ECHL) players
Manitoba Moose players
Memphis RiverKings players
Mississippi RiverKings (CHL) players
Muskegon Fury players
Oklahoma City Blazers (1992–2009) players
Rouyn-Noranda Huskies players
St. John's Maple Leafs players
Sportspeople from Laval, Quebec
Toronto Maple Leafs players
Undrafted National Hockey League players